A Holy Door is traditionally an entrance portal located within the Papal major basilicas in Rome. The doors are normally sealed by mortar and cement from the inside so that they cannot be opened. They are ceremoniously opened during Jubilee years designated by the Pope, for pilgrims who enter through those doors may piously gain the plenary indulgences attached with the Jubilee year celebrations.

In October 2015, Pope Francis expanded the tradition by having each Roman Catholic diocese throughout the world designate one or more local Holy Doors during the Extraordinary Jubilee of Mercy, so that Catholics could gain the plenary indulgences granted during the Jubilee year without having to travel to Rome.

History
Pope Boniface VIII began the tradition of the Holy Year, known as a Jubilee, in 1300 and the Catholic Church has celebrated them every 25 years or so ever since. A major part of the Holy Year for Catholics is a pilgrimage to Rome and the ritual passing over the threshold of the holy door to symbolise the passing into the presence of God. At the same time, remission of the temporal punishment for the pilgrims' sins is granted, known as an indulgence.

One of the earliest accounts of the Holy Year dates back to a Spanish historian, traveler and pilgrim called Pedro Tafur in 1437. Tafur connects the Jubilee indulgence with the right of sanctuary for those who had escaped persecution. He also noted its existence in pagan times for all who crossed the threshold of the Puerta Tarpea previously upon the site of the Archbasilica of St. John Lateran. Accordingly, at the request of Emperor Constantine I, Pope Sylvester I published a Papal Bull proclaiming the same immunity from punishment for Christian sinners who took sanctuary there. The privilege, however, was quickly abused and at some point was even commercialised resulting in popes consequently ordering the door to be sealed with a wall, only to be unsealed during Jubilee years. The wall was destroyed and the door opened once in a hundred years. This was later reduced to fifty years and now "opened at the will of the Pope".

In 1450, the Florentine merchant Giovanni Rucellai of Viterbo cites that the first Jubilee door was opened in 1423 under the pontificate of Pope Martin V.

Rucellai, who lived at the time also speaks of the five doors of the Lateran basilica:

Pope Alexander VI expanded the rite of the Jubilee year of 1500 by opening other doors in Saint Peter's Basilica, Basilica of Saint Mary Major and the Basilica of Saint Paul Outside the Walls. This jubilee year began on Christmas day and ended on the Feast of the Epiphany 1501. During the reign of Pope John VII the holy doors were opened every 50 years, reflecting the number of years attributed to the lifespan of Jesus Christ. This was later amended to 50 years in commemoration of the Hebrew custom of Jubilees and later changed to a centenary or at any time at the will of the reigning Pontiff.

Between 1500 and 1974, the entrance portal was barricaded by a solid wall, not an actual door. The popes themselves began the ritual destruction of these walls followed by masons who completed the actual task demolishing it. This describes a rite that has nearly always supplied the principal subject depicted upon the long series of Jubilee medals issued by the numerous Popes who have opened and closed the holy door at the beginning and end of each Jubilee year. Each of the four basilicas has its own holy door.

After closing the Holy Year on Christmas day 1950 Pope Pius XII replaced the wooden doors installed by Pope Benedict XIV in 1748, which had begun to fall into disrepair, with the 16-panelled bronze doors (modelled by Vico Consorti and cast by Ferdinando Marinelli Artistic Foundry) that are seen today.

Symbolism

In John 10:9, Jesus is quoted as saying, "I am the gate. Whoever enters through me will be saved." In Luke 11:9 is found, "And I tell you, ask and you will receive; seek and you will find; knock and the door will be opened to you." Revelations 3:20 says, "Behold, I stand at the door and knock. If anyone hears my voice and opens the door, (then) I will enter his house and dine with him, and he with me." Dom Albert Hammenstede O.S.B. noted that Porter was one of the minor orders. Herbert Thurston suggests that "the symbolism of this ceremony  may also have been influenced by the old idea of seeking sanctuary".

In the papal bull, Incarnationis mysterium of 29 November 1998, Pope John Paul II formally announced the Great Jubilee of 2000 saying that the Holy Door "evokes the passage from sin to grace". The Holy Door represents "a ritual expression of conversion".

"A Holy Door ... is a visual symbol of internal renewal, which begins with the willing desire to make peace with God, reconcile with your neighbors, restore in yourself everything that has been damaged in the past, and reshape your heart through conversion."

After the Second Vatican Council
In 1975, Pope Paul VI, in light of the modernising changes of the Second Vatican Council revised the rite by removing the use of trowel and ornate bricks at the closing rite.

Pope John Paul II further simplified the ceremony for the Great Jubilee of 2000 for safety reasons; previously, debris had fallen on Pope Paul VI while striking down the door. Workers had removed the concrete before the ceremony of the opening of the door so that the Pope only had to push on the doors with his hands. The holy door of St. Peter's Basilica was opened by the Pope on 24 December 1999 while the doors of St. John Lateran and St. Mary Major were opened on 25 December and 1 January, respectively. Breaking with tradition, the Pope opened both of these personally, rather than delegating this to a cardinal. The doors of the Basilica of Saint Paul Outside the Walls were opened in an ecumenical ceremony on 18 January, first day of the World Week of Prayer for Christian Unity by the Pope, the Archbishop of Canterbury and a representative of the Ecumenical Patriarch. The door in St. Peter's was closed on 6 January 2001, with the others being closed one day earlier.

Until the Great Jubilee of 2000, the Pope knocked upon the door three times with a silver hammer, singing the versicle "Open unto me the gates of justice".

Above the holy door in St. Peter's are marble memorial plates commemorating the last two times that the door has been opened. Since John Paul II and Francis held the last two Jubilees, both plates indicate that they opened and closed the door.

Holy Year of Mercy

In announcing the Extraordinary Jubilee of Mercy Pope Francis declared, "The Holy Door will become a Door of Mercy through which anyone who enters will experience the love of God who consoles, pardons, and instills hope." On 8 December 2015, Pope Francis opened the Holy Door of Mercy in the Basilica of St. Peter, marking the official start of the Jubilee Year of Mercy. A few days later, he presided at the opening of the Holy Door at the Archbasilica of St John Lateran. The Holy Door at St Paul's Outside the Walls was opened by the Archpriest of that Basilica, Cardinal James Harvey. Pope Francis later opened the Holy Door at St Mary Major and at the Caritas center near Rome's central train station.

Francis broke with tradition in removing the necessity of traveling to Rome. In October 2015, a temporal privilege was extended by Pope Francis through the Papal bull of Indiction, "Misericordiae Vultus" for an ordinary bishop to designate his own Holy Door for the purpose of the "Jubilee Year of Mercy". Holy Doors were to be designated in every diocese throughout the world, and could be located at the diocesan Cathedral or at other popular church shrines. On 29 November 2015, prior to the official 8 December start of the Jubilee Year of Mercy, Pope Francis opened the Holy Door at the Cathédrale Notre-Dame in Bangui, Central African Republic. Holy Doors were subsequently opened in 40 different countries around the world, including locations such as Westminster Cathedral, Prinknash Abbey in Gloucestershire, and St. Paul's Basilica in Toronto.

Other Holy Doors canonically designated by the Holy See

The following is a list of Holy Doors designated in perpetuity by the Holy See.

 Pope Alexander III granted this privilege to the Cathedral of Santiago de Compostela in Galicia, Spain by pontifical decree through his papal bull Regis Æterni on 25 July 1178, the Feast of Saint James the Great, principal patron of Spaniards. 
 Pope Benedict XVI granted the privilege of opening a holy door to the Sanctuary of Saint John Vianney, Cure of Ars, in Formans, France in July 2007 for the 150th memorial death anniversary of Saint John Vianney.
 Pope Benedict XVI granted a holy door to the Pontifical University of Santo Tomas in Manila, Philippines on 21 December 2010, to honour the university's 400th anniversary in 2011. 
 Pope Francis gave the Cathedral of Notre-Dame in the city of Quebec, Canada, the privilege of opening a Holy Door on 8 December 2013 to mark its Jubilee Year as the first Catholic parish in North America north of Mexico, celebrating the 350th anniversary since its foundation on 11 July 1666.

See also

 Jubilee (Christianity)

References

External links
 "Holy doors during the Jubilee of Mercy", USCCB

Catholic doctrines
Catholic liturgy
Christian religious objects
Christian prayer
Doors
Holiness
Christianity in Rome